The Women's Junior AHF Cup is a women's international under-21 field hockey competition in Asia organized by the Asian Hockey Federation. The tournament was founded in 2003 and serves as the qualification tournament for the next Junior Asia Cup.

Chinese Taipei have won the most titles with three and Singapore are the defending champions as they won their first title in 2019.

Results

Summary

* = hosts

Team appearances

See also
Men's Junior AHF Cup
Women's AHF Cup
Women's Hockey Junior Asia Cup

References

External links
todor66.com archive

 
Junior AHF Cup
Asian youth sports competitions
Junior AHF Cup
AHF Cup